The Cârgrea is a left tributary of the river Cungra in Romania. It flows into the Cungra in Sâmburești.

References

Rivers of Argeș County
Rivers of Olt County
Rivers of Romania